Iraqi Odyssey is a 2014 Swiss documentary film directed by Samir. It was one of seven films shortlisted by Switzerland to be their submission for the Academy Award for Best Foreign Language Film at the 88th Academy Awards. On 27 August 2015 it was selected to represent Switzerland for the Foreign Language Oscar but it was not nominated.

See also
 List of submissions to the 88th Academy Awards for Best Foreign Language Film
 List of Swiss submissions for the Academy Award for Best Foreign Language Film

References

External links
 

2014 films
2014 documentary films
Swiss documentary films
2010s Arabic-language films